Lao Che is a Polish rock band formed in 1999 in Płock by former members of  the band Koli. Lao Che's musical genre is a crossover of various styles such as ska, ambient, and folk. The band's popularity grew quickly after  their Powstanie Warszawskie (Polish for "Warsaw Uprising") concept album, which received many prestigious nominations and awards.

Current members
Mariusz  Denst – sampler
Hubert Dobaczewski – guitars, vocals
Michał  Jastrzębski – drums
Filip  Różański – keyboards
Rafał  Borycki – bass
Maciek  Dzierżanowski – percussion

Former members
 Jakub  Pokorski – guitars
 Michał  Warzycki - guitars

Discography

Albums

Video albums

References

External links
  Official website

Polish alternative rock groups
Musical groups established in 1999
Mystic Production artists
1999 establishments in Poland